Hyblaea occidentalium is a moth in the family Hyblaeidae described by William Jacob Holland in 1894.

References

Hyblaeidae